Michael Anthony Morrison (November 23, 1934 – April 2, 2003), better known by his stage name Michael Wayne, was an American film producer and actor. He was the eldest son of actor John Wayne and his first wife, Josephine Saenz.

Biography
Born in Los Angeles, California, Wayne graduated from Loyola University in California in 1956 with a Business degree and served in the U.S. Air Force Reserve.

Wayne began his film career as a production assistant on the set of the John Ford film The Quiet Man in 1951. He joined his father's film production company, Batjac Productions, for The Alamo (1960) and became line producer for McLintock! (1963) and producer on many other John Wayne vehicles including Big Jake (1971) and Cahill U.S. Marshal (1973).

Wayne, who developed the reputation of being a good businessman, served on the board of the Motion Picture & Television Fund and was The John Wayne Foundation's president and chairman of the board.  He also was founder and chairman of the board of the John Wayne Cancer Institute at Saint John's Health Center.

Wayne and his wife, Gretchen, had five children, son Christopher, daughters Alicia, Josephine, Maria, and Teresa. He died at the age of 68 of heart failure as the result of complications from lupus erythematosus, just two months before his mother's death.

Filmography
The Quiet Man (1952) (uncredited) as Teenage boy at races
The Conqueror (1956) (uncredited) as Mongol guard
The Alamo (1960) Associate Producer, and assistant to Producer, and first assistant director: second unit (uncredited)
McLintock! (1963) Producer
Cast a Giant Shadow (1966) Co-Producer
The Green Berets (1968) Producer
Chisum (1970) Executive Producer
Big Jake (1971) Producer
The Train Robbers (1973) Producer
Cahill U.S. Marshal (1973) Producer
McQ (1974) Executive Producer
Brannigan (1975) Executive Producer, and presenter 
Rapid Fire (1989) as Eddy Williams
The Lost Platoon - Hayden (1991)

Television appearances
You Bet Your Life, episode #9.15, as himself (1959)
Rowan & Martin's Laugh-In, episode #2.3, as himself (1968)
Hollywood Greats, episode on John Wayne, as himself (1984)
John Wayne's 'The Alamo, video documentary short, as himself (1992)
The Making of 'The Quiet Man''', video documentary short, as himself (1992)The Making of 'Sands of Iwo Jima, video documentary short, as himself (1993)The 12th Annual Golden Boot Awards, telemovie, as himself (1993)Wild Bill: Hollywood Maverick, documentary, as himself (1995)E! True Hollywood Story'', episode "James Bacon: Hollywood Confidential", as himself (1999)

References

External links 

 

1934 births
2003 deaths
20th-century American male actors
American male film actors
Burials at Forest Lawn Memorial Park (Hollywood Hills)
Deaths from lupus
Film producers from California
Hispanic and Latino American male actors
Loyola Marymount University alumni
Male actors from Los Angeles
People with lupus